The Hanover Square station was an express station on the demolished IRT Third Avenue Line in Manhattan, New York City. It had two tracks and one island platform. The station was originally built in 1878 by the New York Elevated Railroad. The next stop to the north was Fulton Street. The next stop to the south was South Ferry. The station closed on December 22, 1950.

In popular culture
Hanover Square station is immortalised in the last movement of Orchestral Set No. 2 by Charles Ives, a recollection of the day the news broke that the liner the Lusitania had been sunk in 1915.

References

External links
 The Third Avenue Elevated (NYCSubway.org)
 https://web.archive.org/web/20100609061601/http://www.stationreporter.net/3avl.htm

IRT Third Avenue Line stations
Railway stations in the United States opened in 1878
Railway stations closed in 1950
1878 establishments in New York (state)
1950 disestablishments in New York (state)
Former elevated and subway stations in Manhattan